Krogstad is a Norwegian surname. It derives from Krókr, a crooked person, and staðr, a farm.

People
 Fredrik Krogstad, Norwegian footballer
 Jonas Krogstad, Norwegian footballer
 Marit Trætteberg née Krogstad, Norwegian chemist
 Rangdi Krogstad, Norwegian politician
 Tore Krogstad, Norwegian goalkeeper

In fiction
 Nils Krogstad in A Doll's House

References